Burntwood is a civil parish in the district of Lichfield, Staffordshire, England.  It contains 16 buildings that are recorded in the National Heritage List for England.  Of these, two are listed at Grade II*, the middle of the three grades, and the others are at Grade II, the lowest grade.  The parish contains the town of Burntwood and the nearby countryside.  Most of the listed buildings are in the periphery of the town or in the countryside.  Most of them are houses and include two churches, cottages, farmhouses and farm buildings, the earlier of which are timber framed.  The other listed buildings include two churches, a conduit head, a water pumping station, and a war memorial.


Key

Buildings

References

Citations

Sources

Lists of listed buildings in Staffordshire